Boy Meets World may refer to:
 Boy Meets World, an American television sitcom that ran from 1993 to 2000
 Boy Meets World (album), the 2007 debut album by hip-hop artist Fashawn
 The Boy Meets World Tour (2017), the fifth tour of the performer Drake